Palpirectia is a monotypic moth genus in the family Erebidae. Its only species, Palpirectia videns, is found in China. Both the genus and the species were first described by Emilio Berio in 1977.

References

Herminiinae
Monotypic moth genera